George Albert Clough (May 27, 1843 – December 30, 1910) was an architect working in Boston in the late 19th-century. He designed the Suffolk County Courthouse in Pemberton Square, and numerous other buildings in the city and around New England. Clough served as the first City Architect of Boston from 1876 to 1883.

Life and career
George Albert Clough was born May 27, 1843, in Blue Hill, Maine. He attended the Blue Hill Academy and worked as a draftsman for his father, the shipbuilder Asa Clough. He moved to Boston in 1863, entering the firm of Snell & Gregerson as a student. He remained with Snell until 1869, when he established his own practice. In 1876 he was elected City Architect of Boston, the first person to hold the office. He continued in that position until 1883, when he was replaced by Charles J. Bateman. He was awarded his largest commission, the Suffolk County Courthouse, in competition two years later in 1885. This building was completed in 1893, largely to Clough's design but with modifications he disapproved of. He was a private practitioner until 1901, when he formed a partnership with Herbert L. Wardner. Clough & Wardner operated until Clough's death in 1910.

Wardner continued to practice on his own in Boston until 1915, when he moved to Poughkeepsie, New York, moving again to Akron, Ohio, in 1919, where he died in 1939.

Personal life
In 1876 Clough married Amelia M. Hinckley of Thetford, Vermont, the sister of Lyman G. Hinckley. They had three children.

Clough died December 30, 1910, at home in Brookline, Massachusetts, at the age of 67.

Legacy
Historian Walter Muir Whitehill described him as "a competent but not very inspired practitioner."  His finer works, typically in Richardsonian Romanesque style, disagree.

A number of Clough's projects have been listed on the United States National Register of Historic Places.

Architectural works

 Gaston Grammar School, City Point, South Boston, 1873
 Fields Corner Municipal Building, Dorchester, Boston, 1874
 Framingham Reservoir No. 1 Dam and Gatehouse, E end of Framingham Reservoir No. 1, off Winter St. N of Long Ave. Framingham, Massachusetts, 1876
 Framingham Reservoir No. 3 Dam and Gatehouse, SE end of Framingham Reservoir No. 3, off MA 9/30 Framingham, Massachusetts, 1876
 English High and Latin School, Montgomery St., Boston, 1877
 Framingham Reservoir No. 2 Dam and Gatehouse, Between Framingham Reservoirs Nos. 1 and 2, W of jct. of Winter and Fountain Sts. Framingham, Massachusetts, 1877
 Marcella Street Home, Boston, 1880
 Prince School, corner Newbury St. and Exeter St., Boston, 1881
 Old State House (Boston, Massachusetts), restored by Clough 1881-1882
 Dillaway School, Boston, 1882
 Calf Pasture Pumping Station Complex, Dorchester, Boston, 1883
 Goddard Hall, Tufts University, Medford, Massachusetts, 1883
 Lyman School for Boys, Westborough, Massachusetts, c.1885, NRHP-listed
 Barncastle, 125 South St. (formerly 'Ideal Lodge') Blue Hill, Maine, 1884
 B.M.C. Durfee High School building, Fall River, Massachusetts, 1886
 Buck Memorial Library, Bucksport, Maine, 1887
 Bridge Academy, ME 127 and ME 197 Dresden, Maine, 1890
 St. Mark's Methodist Church, 90 Park St. Brookline, Massachusetts, 1892
 Curtis Hall, Tufts University, Medford, Massachusetts, 1893
 Suffolk County Courthouse, Pemberton Square, Boston, 1893
 New England Historic Genealogical Society building extension, Somerset St., Boston, 1894
 William Hayes Fogg Memorial Building, Berwick Academy, Maine, 1894
 Church of the Gate of Heaven, South Boston, c.1896
 Parker House, 185 South St. Blue Hill, Maine 1900 remodeling.
 Rockland Public Library, Rockland, Maine, 1903
 Vinalhaven Public Library, Carver St. Vinalhaven, Maine, 1906
 Bridgewater state workhouse
 Westboro insane asylum
 Northampton insane asylum
 Dana Hall, Wellesley, Mass
 Sudbury Aqueduct Linear District, along Sudbury Aqueduct from Farm Pond at Waverly St. to Chestnut Hill Reservoir

Gallery

Notes

References

Further reading
 Massachusetts of today: a memorial of the state, historical and biographical, issued for the World's Columbian exposition at Chicago. Columbia publishing company, 1892.
 Samuel Atkins Eliot, ed. "George Albert Clough." Biographical history of Massachusetts: biographies and autobiographies of the leading men in the state, Volume 3. Boston: Massachusetts Biographical Society, 1911

External links

 WorldCat
 Flickr. Photo of Prince School building, Boston, 2005
 Flickr. Photo of Calf Pasture Pumping Station building, Boston, 2003
 Flickr. Photo of Calf Pasture Pumping Station building, Boston, 2009
 Flickr. Photo of Calf Pasture Pumping Station building, Boston, 2009
 Flickr. Photo of Calf Pasture Pumping Station building, Boston, 2009

1843 births
1910 deaths
Architects from Boston
19th century in Boston
George A. Clough buildings
People from Blue Hill, Maine